Pakistan is the 5th-largest producer of dates in the world.

Production
Pakistan is one of biggest producers and exporters of dates in the world, annually producing 535,000 tons according to the Trade Development Authority.

The main regions for date cultivation are the Khairpur district and the Panjgur District.

Varieties
There are more than 160 varieties of dates palm in the Pakistan, among them the popular varieties are:
Aseel of Khairpur, 
Dhakki of D.I.Khan 
Begum Jangi of Mekran.

Panjgur date processing plant
Dates processing Plant in year 2022 Panjgur Pakistan begins production with United Arab Emirates assistance funded by the Abu Dhabi Fund for Development (ADFD) at a cost of $6.36 million.
The project area is 5,710 square metres, and produces over 32,000 tonnes per day.

References

 
Desert fruits
Drought-tolerant trees
Edible palms
Garden plants of Asia
Ornamental trees
dactylifera
Date palm
Tropical agriculture
Tropical fruit